Hadrokolos is a genus of robber flies in the family Asilidae. There are at least four described species in Hadrokolos.

Species
These four species belong to the genus Hadrokolos:
 Hadrokolos cazieri Martin, 1959 i c g
 Hadrokolos notialis Martin, 1967 c g
 Hadrokolos pritchardi Martin, 1959 i c g
 Hadrokolos texanus (Bromley, 1934) i c g b
Data sources: i = ITIS, c = Catalogue of Life, g = GBIF, b = Bugguide.net

References

Further reading

 
 
 

Asilidae genera
Articles created by Qbugbot